This article lists rosters and transactions during the 2022 T1 League off-season and the 2022–23 T1 League season.

Front office movements

Head coaching changes

Off-season

In-season

General manager changes

Off-season

In-season

Draft 

There were 44 players participated in the draft, and 14 players were chosen in 3 rounds.

Trades

On loan

Pre-Season Transactions

Mid-Season Transactions

See also 
 2022–23 Kaohsiung Aquas season
 2022–23 New Taipei CTBC DEA season
 2022–23 Taichung Suns season
 2022–23 Tainan TSG GhostHawks season
 2022–23 TaiwanBeer HeroBears season
 2022–23 Taoyuan Leopards season

References

External links 

2022–23
2022–23 T1 League season